is a Japanese actress. She starred as Rei, the Zero Woman, in the 2004 V-cinema version of that long running series of films and videos.

Filmography
 Shin Zero Ūman - 0-ka no onna: futatabi... (2004 aka Zero Woman 2005) Underrated Best Cool 
  (2010)

References

External links

1973 births
Japanese television personalities
Japanese actresses
Japanese gravure idols
Living people